Amjhad Nazih (born 18 January 2002) is a French professional footballer who plays as a goalkeeper for Nîmes Olympique.

Club career 
Amjhad Nazih made his professional debut for Nîmes Olympique on the 10 February 2021, starting as a goalkeeper against Nice in Coupe de France.

International career 
Nazih is a youth international with France, taking part to the FIFA U-17 World Cup in 2019, were the French ended third.

Being of Moroccan descent, Nazih also took part in a training session with Morocco's youth team.

References

External links

2002 births
Living people
People from Sète
Sportspeople from Hérault
French sportspeople of Moroccan descent
French footballers
Footballers from Occitania (administrative region)
Association football goalkeepers
France youth international footballers
Nîmes Olympique players
Championnat National 2 players
Championnat National 3 players